Glipa brunneipennis is a species of beetle in the genus Glipa. It was described in 1955.

References

brunneipennis
Beetles described in 1955